1894 was the fifth season of County Championship cricket in England. The championship culminated in a close battle between Surrey and the 1893 champions Yorkshire. Before the round of 23 August, the two teams were tied on 10 points, with one match left to play and all other teams out of contention. Yorkshire travelled to Taunton to play Somerset and, after the first day was rained off, Somerset had to bat on a rain-affected pitch. George Hirst took seven for 32 as Somerset were dismissed for 99, but Yorkshire never got the chance to reply as the third day was rained off. Meanwhile, at Hove, Surrey's Tom Richardson and Bill Lockwood bowling Sussex out for 44 and 109 to secure victory by an innings and 15 runs, giving Surrey their fourth official title.

Although the term had been in common usage for many years, there was no clear understanding of what constituted first-class cricket. The issue was addressed in a meeting at Lord's in May and the official definition was applied from the beginning of the 1895 season.

Honours
County Championship – Surrey
Wisden (Five Young Batsmen of the Season) – Bill Brockwell, Jack Brown, C B Fry, Tom Hayward, Archie MacLaren

County Championship

Final table 

Points system:

 1 for a win
 0 for a draw, a tie or an abandoned match
 -1 for a loss

Most runs in the County Championship

Most wickets in the County Championship

Overall first-class statistics

Leading batsmen

Leading bowlers

References

Annual reviews
 James Lillywhite's Cricketers' Annual (Red Lilly), Lillywhite, 1895
 Wisden Cricketers' Almanack 1895

External links
 Cricket in England in 1894

1894 in English cricket
1894